Chuea Patthamachinda (2 February 1885 – 16 March 1982), better known by the noble title Luang Wisansinlapakam, was a Thai traditional artisan and architect. He worked under various government departments, including the Poh Chang School of Arts and Crafts, where he taught for 17 years. Later in life, he also taught at Silpakorn University, where he was named adjunct professor. He is known for various forms of the traditional visual arts, as well as architecture. He designed numerous Buddhist temples, and is credited with an eclectic output of modern and applied Thai architecture, mostly stemming from various collaborations with Edward Healey and Phra Sarotrattananimman.

References

Thai artists
Thai architects
Fellows of the Royal Society of Thailand
Luang (nobility)
Recipients of the Dushdi Mala Medal, Pin of Arts and Science
1885 births
1982 deaths